This is a list of lakes of Romania. Notable lakes include Lake Sfânta Ana, the only crater lake in Romania, and Lake Razelm, the largest liman in the country.

Major natural lakes

Glacial lakes

In volcanic craters

Karstic lakes

Behind natural dams

In depressions

On river banks

On river-maritime banks

Lagoons

In river valleys

In Danube Delta

Major reservoirs

Major mountain lakes

Other (minor) mountain lakes

Other lakes
Lake Sărat: "Sărat" = "Salty"; at its bottom is still a crust of salt. Near Brăila. A small beach.
Lake Someșu Rece: it is located in Cluj County

See also

List of lakes in Bucharest
Ocna Sibiului mine#Lakes of the salt mine

References

External links
 Paul Decei, Lacuri de munte, Editura Sport–Turism, 1981
    Anuarul 2004 al Institutului Naţional de Statistică

Romania
Lakes